Perch Lake is a small lake located west of the hamlet of Arena in Delaware County, New York. Perch Lake drains east via an unnamed creek which flows into the Pepacton Reservoir.

See also
 List of lakes in New York

References 

Lakes of New York (state)
Lakes of Delaware County, New York